The following is a summary of Down county football team's 2011 season.

Kits
McKenna Cup and NFL kits:

Championship kits:

Competitions

McGeough Cup

Squad
1 Gavin Joyce, 2 Eoin Costello, 3 Gary McCardle, 4 Colm Murney, 5 James Colgan, 6 Kevin McKernan, 7 Michael McCartan, 8 Declan Sheeran, 9 Peter Fitzpatrick, 10 Martin Clarke, 11 Aidan Carr, 12 Brendan Coulter, 13 John Clarke, 14 Joe Ireland, 15 Mark PolandSubs: Cathal Murdock, Kevin Duffin, Kevin Anderson, Liam Doyle, Michael Magee, Ronan Murtagh, Christopher Duggan, Paul Devlin, Packie Downey, Conor Poland, Michael Magee.

Results

Dr McKenna Cup

Squad
Gary McArdle, Dan Gordon, Aidan Brannigan, Aidan Carr, Peter Fitzpatrick, Kalum King, Liam Doyle, Mark Poland, Brendan Coulter, Paul Devlin, Martin Clarke, Cathal Murdock, Sean Murdock, Kevin Anderson, James Colgan, Conor Maginn, Ronan Murtagh, Michael McCartan, Conor Poland, Paul McPolin, Declan Sheerin, Kevin Duffin, Michael Magee, Kevin McKernan, Gavin Joyce, Christopher Duggan, Ryan Brady, Packie Downey and Philip Bonny.

Fixtures

2011-01-08 Down vs St Mary's – Postponed due to frozen pitch
2011-01-22 Down vs St Mary's – Postponed due to fog

Table

Matches and reports

National Football League Division 1

Squad
Michael Magee, John Clarke, Martin Clarke, Brendan McVeigh, Ronan Murtagh, Peter Fitzpatrick, Luke Howard, Kalum King, Conor Maginn, Gerard McCartan, Kevin McKernan Cathal Murdock, Aidan Carr, Paul McPolin, Paul McComiskey, Aidan Brannigan, Conor Laverty, Dan Gordon, Liam Doyle, Conor Poland, Mark Poland, Brendan Coulter, Ronan Sexton, Colm Murney, Daniel Hughes, Declan Alder

Fixtures

Table

Matches

Ulster Senior Football Championship

The draw for the 2011 Ulster Senior Football Championship took place on 7 October 2010.

Squad
Declan Alder, Aidan Branagan, Aidan Carr, Martin Clarke James Colgan, Brendan Coulter, Mark Doran, Liam Doyle, Kevin Duffin, Peter Fitzpatrick, Conor Garvey, Dan Gordan, Michael Magee, Conor Maginn, Kevin McKernan, Anton McArdle, Brendan McArdle, John McAreavey, Daniel McCartan, Eoin McCartan, Gerard McCartan, Paul McComiskey, Paul McPolin, Brendan McVeigh, Cathal Murdock, Sean Murdock, Paul Murphy, Ronan Murtagh, Darren O'Hagan, Conor Poland, Mark Poland, Damien Rafferty, Ambrose Rogers, Declan Rooney, Caolan Mooney

Fixtures

Rounds

Matches

All-Ireland Senior Football Championship

Qualifiers

References

Down
Gaelic
Down county football team seasons